The St. Vincent De Paul Catholic Church in Cape Girardeau, Missouri is a historic church at 131 South Main Street.  It was listed on the National Register of Historic Places in 1982.

Architecture 

The church was built in the English Perpendicular Gothic Revival style using red brick with sandstone trim on a foundation of sandstone. It was designed by Irish-born architect Thomas Waryng Walsh.

History 

St. Vincent De Paul is situated on the site of Louis Lorimier's Red House. In 1821, priests began making periodic visits to settlers in the area.  By 1833, the land where the church stands today had been secured, and by 1836 Cape Girardeau had its first permanent priest, Reverend John Odin.  The cornerstone for the church was laid in April 1838 by Bishop Rosati of St. Louis. The church was named for the Vincentian fathers who founded it as well as St. Vincent's College. This church was destroyed by a tornado in 1850.  The present church was constructed on the original foundations of the first church, with construction beginning in 1851 and finishing in 1853. The church tower has been struck twice by lightning and destroyed in 1912. The church was added to the National Register in 1982. It is located in the Courthouse-Seminary Neighborhood Historic District.

Gallery

References

Individually listed contributing properties to historic districts on the National Register in Missouri
Roman Catholic churches completed in 1853
Churches in the Roman Catholic Diocese of Springfield–Cape Girardeau
Churches on the National Register of Historic Places in Missouri
Greek Revival church buildings in Missouri
Churches in Cape Girardeau, Missouri
National Register of Historic Places in Cape Girardeau County, Missouri
19th-century Roman Catholic church buildings in the United States